Alla Kudryavtseva and Anastasia Rodionova were defending champions, but chose not to participate together.  Rodionova partnered up with her sister Arina, but they lost in the quarterfinals to Garbiñe Muguruza and Carla Suárez Navarro.  Kudryavtseva played alongside Anastasia Pavlyuchenkova, but they lost in the semifinals to Muguruza and Suárez Navarro.
Tímea Babos and Kristina Mladenovic won the title, defeating Muguruza and Suárez Navarro in the final, 6–3, 6–2.

Seeds 
The top four seeds received a bye into the second round.

Draw

Finals

Top half

Bottom half

References
Main Draw

Dubai Doubles
Women's Doubles